Brianna Alexandra Maitland (born October 8, 1986; disappeared March 19, 2004) is an American teenager who disappeared after leaving her job at the Black Lantern Inn in Montgomery, Vermont. She was 17 years old at the time. Maitland's car was discovered the following day, backed into the side of an abandoned house about a mile (1.6 km) away from her workplace. She has not been seen or heard from since. Due to a confluence of circumstances, several days passed before Maitland's friends and family reported her missing.

In the days and weeks following her disappearance, numerous tips were investigated by state law enforcement, including a claim that Maitland was being held captive in a house occupied by local drug dealers of whom she was an acquaintance; however, none of the tips resulted in her discovery. An alleged 2006 sighting of Maitland at a casino in Atlantic City, New Jersey, brought renewed interest to the case, but the woman seen was never properly identified. In 2012, law enforcement investigated a possible connection between Maitland's disappearance and serial killer Israel Keyes, who committed numerous rapes and murders in Vermont, New York, and throughout the Pacific Northwest, but he was ultimately ruled out as a suspect by the FBI.

Maitland's case was profiled across various local media, on Dateline NBC, and the documentary series Disappeared. In 2017, the case was discussed in the documentary series on missing college student Maura Murray, who vanished a month prior to Maitland in Woodsville, New Hampshire. , Maitland's disappearance remains unsolved.

Background

Early life
Brianna Maitland was born October 8, 1986, in Burlington, Vermont, to Bruce and Kellie Maitland (née Fisher). She was raised with her older brother on their parents' farm in East Franklin, Vermont, near the Canadian border. In her youth, she was extensively trained in jiu-jitsu. Maitland attended Missisquoi Valley Union High School before transferring to Enosburg Falls High School in nearby Enosburg Falls, during her sophomore year.

Prior to disappearance
On Maitland's seventeenth birthday in October 2003, she decided she wanted to move away from her parents' farm. Maitland enrolled at her friends' high school, but her living arrangements were unstable, as she moved in and out of several friends' homes. To complete her education, Maitland enrolled in a GED program.

Three weeks prior to her disappearance, Maitland was physically attacked at a party by a female former friend, Keallie Lacross. The motive for the attack was unclear, though Brianna's father, Bruce, would later state that he believed it stemmed from jealousy over Maitland's interaction with a male peer at the party. One of Maitland's friends at the party claimed that Maitland, despite her martial arts training, refused to fight with Lacross, who subsequently hit her in the face several times while Maitland was seated in a truck. The altercation resulted in Maitland's suffering a broken nose and concussion; she later filed charges against Lacross. The complaint was subsequently dropped three weeks after Maitland disappeared, and police stated that Lacross was cleared of any involvement in her disappearance.

Disappearance

Friday, March 19, 2004

On the morning of Friday, March 19, 2004, Maitland took an exam to receive her GED. After completing the test, she and her mother, Kellie, had lunch to celebrate the occasion; her father, Bruce, was out of state working in New York at the time. Her mother described her as being in good spirits, and that Maitland had discussed plans of attending college.

After lunch, Maitland and her mother spent the afternoon shopping and running errands. While waiting in the check-out line of a store, Kellie said something outside caught Brianna's attention; she told her mother she would return shortly, and left the store. Kellie completed her purchase and met Brianna in the parking lot, and noticed that her daughter seemed unnerved, shaken, and agitated. She told her mother that she needed to go home and prepare for her upcoming work shift at the Black Lantern Inn, a restaurant in Montgomery. Not wanting to pry, Kellie did not ask what had happened, and dropped Brianna off at Stout's home between 3:30 and 4:00pm. This was the last time she saw her daughter. At some point before leaving for her work shift, Maitland left a note for Stout saying she would return after work that evening. Maitland then departed for the Black Lantern Inn in a 1985 Oldsmobile sedan registered to Kellie.

After completing her shift at work, Maitland clocked out and left the Black Lantern Inn at approximately 11:20 p.m. She told her co-workers she needed to get home and rest before working the next day at her second job in St. Albans. By all accounts Maitland was alone in her vehicle when she left.

Saturday, March 20, 2004

Discovery of vehicle

Early the next afternoon, on March 20, a Vermont State Police trooper was dispatched to an abandoned house on Route 118 in Richford, about a mile from the Black Lantern Inn. Maitland's Oldsmobile was found backed into the side of the house. Known locally as "the old Dutchburn house," the siding of the home had been breached by the rear end of the car. A piece of plywood that had been covering a window lay on the car's trunk. Two of Maitland's paychecks were on the front seat of the car, and outside it, law enforcement observed loose change, a water bottle, and an unsmoked cigarette. The trooper assumed the car had been abandoned by a drunk driver, and a towing company took the vehicle to a local garage.

Maitland was not reported missing for a number of days. Her mother Kellie did not learn about the discovery of Maitland's car until five days afterward. Stout saw Maitland's note on Friday, March 19, spent the weekend away, and found the note undisturbed when she returned on Monday. Assuming Maitland was staying elsewhere, she did not call Kellie until the following day. On Tuesday, March 23, Kellie began calling various people in order to find Maitland, including friends as well as her employers, none of whom had seen or spoken to her. Failing in her efforts—and still unaware that the vehicle Maitland had been driving had been recovered—she filed a missing persons report that day. On Thursday, March 25, Maitland's parents gave photos of her to Vermont State Police in St. Albans. A trooper showed them a picture of the Oldsmobile found at the old Dutchburn house, upon which they immediately identified the car as their daughter's. Kellie said in interviews that she was "instinctively revulsed" by the photo, and believed someone else, not Maitland, had left the car in such a way.

Witness sightings
After Maitland's reported disappearance, several individuals came forward to law enforcement to report sightings of Maitland's vehicle at the old Dutchburn house the night she disappeared:

 A man who drove by the house between 11:30 p.m. and 12:30 a.m. on March 19–20 said the car's headlights may have been on. He said he did not see anyone in or around the car.
 A second man who drove by between midnight and 12:30 a.m. on Saturday, March 20, recalled seeing a turn signal flashing on the car.
 Around 4:00 a.m. on Saturday, March 20, a former boyfriend of Maitland's drove past the scene after a night of partying across the border in Canada. He thought he recognized the vehicle, but he did not see anyone in or around it.
 The next morning, some passing motorists found the scene odd enough that they stopped and took pictures of it. One of the photographers reported some loose change, a water bottle, and a bracelet or necklace on the ground next to the car.

Investigation

Initial findings
The Vermont State Police, who led the official investigation for the first months after Maitland's disappearance, were skeptical that foul play was involved, considering the possibility that Maitland was a runaway. The area surrounding the old Dutchburn house was combed on foot by police and search dogs, but nothing was found. Maitland's vehicle was processed by the state crime laboratory for evidence on March 30, 2004, after the car had been impounded at a local garage for several days. Upon the car's return to the Maitland family, Bruce noted that his daughter's ATM card, glasses, contact lens case, and migraine medication had all been left inside.

It was later concluded by law enforcement that foul play was the probable cause of Maitland's disappearance, and a 2007 flyer provided by the FBI stated that the scene at which Maitland's car was discovered may have been staged to appear as an accident. Maitland's parents publicly speculated that she may have been abducted by multiple people, stating that it would have been difficult for a single assailant to subdue her given her jiu-jitsu training.

The disappearance of Maura Murray, a college student from Massachusetts, in northwest New Hampshire the month before was deemed unrelated to Maitland's disappearance by law enforcement, in spite of the events occurring within  of each other. In 2004, Maitland's family organized a website, now defunct, titled bringbrihome.org, with a posted maximum reward of USD$20,000 for information leading to her whereabouts. The website was active until at least 2009. According to a March 2017 article published in the Burlington Free Press, the reward remained available. In June 2017, however, it was reported that the reward was due to expire in early July of that year.

Allegations and affidavit
In the week following Maitland's disappearance, the Vermont State Police received an anonymous tip claiming that she was being held against her will in a house in nearby Berkshire, Vermont,  from Montgomery. The rented house, then occupied by Ramon L. Ryans and Nathaniel Charles Jackson, two known drug dealers from New York, was raided by police on April 15, 2004. Various drug paraphernalia was discovered inside, as well as substantial amounts of cocaine and marijuana, but no sign of Maitland was found. Ryans was arrested during the raid for drug charges. Upon interviewing Maitland's close friends, law enforcement was informed that Maitland had allegedly experimented with hard drugs in the recent past, specifically crack cocaine, and was an acquaintance of Ryans and Jackson.

In late 2004, police received a statement from an anonymous "older female" who implicated both Ryans and Jackson in Maitland's disappearance and alleged murder. The signed affidavit contained allegations, written in graphic detail, that Maitland had been murdered approximately a week after her disappearance. The woman who provided the affidavit claimed that Ryans murdered Maitland during an argument over money she had lent him to purchase crack, and that her body had been temporarily stored in the basement of a recently incarcerated local woman's home; Maitland's body was then allegedly dismembered with a table saw and disposed of on a pig farm. Law enforcement was unable to corroborate the claims in the letter.

The Maitland family additionally reported that they had received several uncorroborated anonymous phone calls from persons claiming Maitland was "tied to a tree in the woods," and that she had been disposed of at the bottom of a lake.

Later developments
In 2006, security footage at the Caesars World casino in Atlantic City, New Jersey, showed a woman resembling Maitland sitting at a poker table. The woman was never properly identified.

In 2012, law enforcement investigated a potential connection between Maitland's disappearance and serial killer Israel Keyes, who committed numerous rapes and murders in  Alaska, Oregon, and Washington, as well as in Vermont and New York, where he owned property in Constable. The FBI ruled out Keyes's potential connection to Maitland's disappearance in late December 2012, shortly after Keyes committed suicide in Anchorage, Alaska.

In March 2016, on the case's twelfth anniversary, investigators revealed to a local television station they had recovered DNA samples from Maitland's car. The results of the DNA tests were not made public. In July 2016, the farmhouse where Maitland's vehicle was discovered was destroyed in a fire.

In March 2022, Vermont State Police revealed they had found a match to the DNA sample found in Maitland's car. The VSP has not released the identity of the person, yet did say it belonged to 1 of 11 people they tested previously in connection to Maitland's case.

Media depictions
Maitland's case has been profiled by Dateline NBC and on the Investigation Discovery documentary series Disappeared in December 2011. Maitland's disappearance was also mentioned in an episode of 20/20. In 2016, her case was profiled on the podcast The Vanished. In 2017, her case was profiled in an episode of the documentary series The Disappearance of Maura Murray on the Oxygen network.

See also
 List of people who disappeared

Notes

References

Works cited

External links

Maitland family Facebook page

1986 births
2000s missing person cases
2004 in Vermont
Crimes in Vermont
March 2004 events in the United States
Missing American children
Missing person cases in Vermont
Montgomery, Vermont
People from Burlington, Vermont
Living people